Goransko is a small town in the municipality of Plužine, Montenegro.

Demographics
According to the 2003 census, the town has a population of 334 people. Piva Monastery was rebuilt here in 1982.

According to the 2011 census, its population was 272.

References

Populated places in Plužine Municipality
Serb communities in Montenegro